is a Japanese music composer, best known for his contributions in video games. He serves as the representative director of Noisycroak, a Tokyo-based sound design company focused on game soundtracks. Echochrome II has been accepted into the Guinness Book of World Records for the longest single musical track that lasts 75 minutes and 7 seconds in video game music history.

Early life and education 
Sakamoto started playing classical piano at the age of 4. He graduated from WASEDA University in 2004.

Works

References

External links
Noisycroak (Japanese)
Siliconera Interview with Hideki Sakamoto

1972 births
Japanese male musicians
Living people
Musicians from Tokyo
Video game composers